Field hockey was contested at the 2013 Summer Universiade from July 7 through July 15 in Kazan, Russia.

Medal summary

Medal table

Medal events

Men

Ten teams participated in the men's tournament.

Teams

Group A

Group B

Women

Four teams participated in the women's tournament.

Teams

References

External links
2013 Summer Universiade – Field hockey
Results book

 
Summer Universiade
2013 Summer Universiade events
2013 Summer Universiade